The FedEx St. Jude Classic was a professional golf tournament held in Memphis, Tennessee as a regular event on the PGA Tour. The tournament was held annually from 1958 through 2018, and was played in June at TPC Southwind (since 1989).

In 2019, FedEx took over sponsorship of the WGC Invitational and relocated the tournament to Memphis in late July.  The relocated WGC event continues the charitable relationship with St. Jude Children's Research Hospital.  The new name for the relocated event is the WGC-FedEx St. Jude Invitational For the 2021–22 season, the WGC Invitational was discontinued, and the first FedEx Cup playoff event was relocated to TPC Southwind with FedEx as the new title sponsor; the event will be named the FedEx St. Jude Championship.

History
The tournament debuted  in May 1958 as the Memphis Open and was played annually at Colonial Country Club in Memphis through 1971, then at the club's  new home in Cordova through 1988. The late Vernon Bell, a Memphis restaurateur, co-founded the tournament and served as the tournament's general chairman for 22 years. He is also the father of the late Chris Bell.

St. Jude
In 1969, entertainer Danny Thomas (1912–1991) agreed to lend his name to the tournament in exchange for his St. Jude Children's Research Hospital becoming the tournament's charity. Accordingly, the tournament changed its name the next year to the Danny Thomas Memphis Classic.

In 1977, President Gerald Ford, who had left office in January, made a hole-in-one during the tournament's celebrity pro-am while playing with Thomas and Ben Crenshaw. Two days later, Al Geiberger shot a PGA Tour record 59 (−13) in the second round with eleven birdies and an eagle. He needed a rally on Sunday to win by three strokes at 273 (–15).

Federal Express
In 1986, Memphis-based courier Federal Express became the title sponsor. For the first three years of their sponsorship, FedEx increased the purse one dollar for each package they shipped on the Friday of the tournament. The purses went from $500,000 to $605,912 in 1986, from $600,000 to $724,043 in 1987, and from $750,000 to $953,842 in 1988.

The Stanford Financial Group took over as the tournament's title sponsor in 2007, and it was renamed Stanford St. Jude Championship. In 2009, the tournament changed its name to St. Jude Classic, following accusations that the Stanford Financial Group was a Ponzi scheme. FedEx returned as title sponsor in 2011.

TPC Southwind
It moved to its present location at TPC Southwind in Memphis in 1989.
  
The purse in 2018 was $6.6 million, with a winner's share of $1.188 million.

Tournament highlights
1958: Billy Maxwell wins the first Memphis Open. He beats Cary Middlecoff by one shot. 
1961: Local favorite Cary Middlecoff beats Gardner Dickinson and Mike Souchak by five shots.
1965: Jack Nicklaus, who played in Memphis very infrequently, beats Johnny Pott on the first hole of a sudden death playoff.
1966: Bert Yancey wins by five shots over Gene Littler but only after nearly missing his Sunday tee time. A last moment phone call from his caddy kept Yancey from being disqualified.
1967: Dave Hill goes wire-to-wire for his first Memphis win. He defeats Johnny Pott by two shots.
1970: Dave Hill becomes the first Memphis winner to successfully defend his title. He defeats Homero Blancas, Frank Beard, and Bob Charles by one shot.
1971: Lee Trevino wins in Memphis for the first time. He defeats Jerry Heard, Hale Irwin,  Lee Elder and Randy Wolff by four shots.
1973: Dave Hill earns his 4th and final Memphis win. He beats Allen Miller and Lee Trevino by one shot.
1977: Al Geiberger shoots a second round 59 (the first 59 in a PGA Tour event), then holds on to win the tournament by three shots over Gary Player and Jerry McGee. 
1980: Lee Trevino triumphs in Memphis for the third and final time. He beats Tom Purtzer by one shot.
1981: After making a birdie on the 72nd hole to win by two shots over Tom Kite and Bruce Lietzke, Jerry Pate leaps into the lake adjoining the 18th green.
1986: Mike Hulbert birdies the 72nd hole for his first ever PGA Tour win. He wins by one shot over his roommate for the week, Joey Sindelar.
1987: Mike McGee becomes one of just eight PGA Tour players with an 18-putt round. Despite the feat, McGee missed the cut.
1992: Jay Haas shoots 64–64 over the last 36 holes to win by three shots over Dan Forsman and Robert Gamez. 
1994: PGA Tour rookie Dicky Pride beats Gene Sauers and Hal Sutton in a playoff with a birdie on the first hole.
1996: John Cook shoots a PGA Tour record 189 for 54 holes on his way to a seven shot win over John Adams.
1997: Greg Norman birdies the final three holes to beat Dudley Hart by one shot.
2000: Notah Begay III beats Bob May and Chris DiMarco by one shot. It is his first win after being convicted of drunken driving in March of the same year and having to spend seven days in jail.
2003: David Toms shoots a final round 64 to get his first of back-to-back Memphis titles. He beats Nick Price by three shots. 
2005: Justin Leonard ties the record for the highest final round score by a Memphis winner, a 73, on his way to a one-shot victory over David Toms.
2010: Lee Westwood defeats Robert Karlsson and Robert Garrigus in a sudden-death playoff after Garrigus comes to the 72nd hole with a three-shot lead before finishing with a triple bogey.
2011: After 13 years and 355 starts, Harrison Frazar won his first PGA Tour event after beating Robert Karlsson in a playoff. Frazar was playing on a medical extension after hip surgery and was actually considering retirement before his win. Karlsson lost in a playoff for the second consecutive season.
2017: Daniel Berger becomes the first golfer since David Toms to win back-to-back.

Course
TPC Southwind in 2013

Source:

Winners

Note: Green highlight indicates scoring records.
Sources:

Multiple winners
Seven men have won the St. Jude Classic more than once through 2018.

4 wins: Dave Hill (1967, 1969, 1970, 1973)
3 wins: Lee Trevino (1971, 1972, 1980)
2 wins: Nick Price (1993, 1998), David Toms (2003, 2004), Justin Leonard (2005, 2008), Daniel Berger (2016, 2017), Dustin Johnson (2012, 2018)

References

External links

History of Vernon Bell co-founding the event
Coverage on PGA Tour's official site
St. Jude Children's Research Hospital
TPC Southwind

Former PGA Tour events
Golf in Tennessee
Sports in Memphis, Tennessee
St. Jude Children's Research Hospital
Recurring sporting events established in 1958
Recurring sporting events disestablished in 2018
1958 establishments in Tennessee
2018 disestablishments in Tennessee